The 1983 European Wrestling Championships  was held from 17 to 24 April 1983 in Budapest, Hungary.

Medal table

Medal summary

Men's freestyle

Men's Greco-Roman

References

External links
Fila's official championship website

Europe
W
European Wrestling Championships
Euro
Sports competitions in Budapest
1983 in European sport